Claudia Dreher (born 2 May 1971 in Magdeburg) is a female long-distance runner from Germany. She competed for her native country at the 2000 Summer Olympics in Sydney, Australia.

Achievements

Personal bests
Half marathon – 1:11:57 hrs (2004)
Marathon – 2:27:55 hrs (1999)

References

1971 births
Living people
German female long-distance runners
German female marathon runners
East German female long-distance runners
Athletes (track and field) at the 2000 Summer Olympics
Olympic athletes of Germany
Sportspeople from Magdeburg
Tokyo Marathon female winners
21st-century German women
20th-century German women